Urayoán Hernández Alvarado is a Puerto Rican politician affiliated with the New Progressive Party (PNP). He was elected to the 29th House of Representatives of Puerto Rico in the 2012 Puerto Rican general election to represent District 26. Has a B.A. degree in surveying and cartography at the Polytechnic University of Puerto Rico.

Notes

References

|-

 

Date of birth missing (living people)
Living people
New Progressive Party members of the House of Representatives of Puerto Rico
People from Orocovis, Puerto Rico
Place of birth missing (living people)
Year of birth missing (living people)